The 1977 Sumba earthquake (also called the Sumbawa earthquake) occurred approximately  south of Bima, Sumbawa, and beneath the Indian Ocean, at . With a moment magnitude of 8.3, the earthquake is notable for having an unusually great magnitude for a shock with a normal faulting focal mechanism. The shock occurred near the southern section of the Sunda Trench where several other tsunami-generating earthquakes have occurred. The earthquake was at the time the largest outer-rise earthquake ever recorded in Indonesia, and aftershocks along the trench extended about  eastward and  westward from the epicenter.

Although damage from the earthquake was limited to Indonesia, ground movement was reportedly felt as far afield as Albany in Australia, and the power supply was briefly cut in Port Hedland. The combined number of victims from both the earthquake and tsunami in Indonesia was at least 107 confirmed dead and several dozen others missing, presumed dead; several sources combine the two for a total casualty figure of approximately 180 deaths and 1,100 injuries.

See also
List of earthquakes in 1977
List of earthquakes in Indonesia
List of earthquakes in Australia

References

Sources

External links

1977 earthquakes
Earthquakes in Indonesia
1977 tsunamis
Tsunamis in Australia
Tsunamis in Indonesia
August 1977 events in Asia